Niknam Deh (also Romanized as Nīknām Deh; also known as Vālāmeh and Vanāmeh) is a village in Owzrud Rural District, Baladeh District, Nur County, Mazandaran Province, Iran. At the 2006 census, its population was 73, in 34 families.

References 

Populated places in Nur County